The Mosque of Ierapetra is a historical Ottoman mosque located in the town of Ierapetra, on the island of Crete, Greece. Like the other mosques in Crete, today it is not open for worship.

Description 
Based on inscription found in the mosque itself, it was erected around 1891-1892, perhaps on the site of a previous mosque or perhaps a church dedicated to Saint John. The upper part of the minaret collapsed during the 1953 earthquake.

Architecture  
Ierapetra's mosque is a square building with a wooden, hipped roof covered with tiles. Its architecture style features elements derived from the neoclassical and eclectic trends that reached Crete during the last decades of the 19th century.

The mihrab, or praying niche, is found on the southeast inner side of the building. It is surrounded by a carved painted panel with a pedimented finial on the tympanum of which is placed an inverted medal bearing an Arabic inscription. The—now roofless—minaret stands on the northwestern corner of the mosque. Now surviving up to the second balcony, its uppermost part fell in the 1953 earthquake. Following that, the minaret underwent some restoration work.

The Ottoman fountain is located to the southwest of the mosque, and together with it they once constituted a remarkable complex of Ottoman architecture in Crete. The fountain is an octagonal building with domed roofs, made with worked stones of various sizes. On all sides, the outflow holes as well as water collection troughs are still preserved.

See also 
 Islam in Greece
 List of mosques in Greece
 List of former mosques in Greece
 Ottoman Greece

References 

Ottoman architecture in Crete
Ottoman mosques in Greece
Former mosques in Greece
19th-century architecture in Greece
19th-century mosques
Mosques completed in 1891